Moquino is a census-designated place (CDP) in Cibola County, New Mexico, United States. The population was 37 at the 2010 census.

Geography
It is bordered to the west by Bibo and to the northwest by Seboyeta.

Demographics

Education 
All public schools in the county are operated by Grants/Cibola County Schools.

References

Census-designated places in Cibola County, New Mexico
Census-designated places in New Mexico